Events from the year 1993 in Jordan.

Incumbents
Monarch: Hussein 
Prime Minister: Zaid ibn Shaker (until 29 May), Abdelsalam al-Majali (starting 29 May)

Events

Births

 25 July - Raja'i Ayed.
 Ahmed Al-Essawi.

See also

 Years in Iraq
 Years in Syria
 Years in Saudi Arabia

References

 
1990s in Jordan
Jordan
Jordan
Years of the 20th century in Jordan